Witold E(rasmus) Rybczynski (June 2, 1881 in Stanisławów 
– August 13, 1949 in Lusławice) was a Polish physicist and mathematician, a professor at the Lviv Polytechnic, and a high-school teacher.

20th-century Polish physicists
20th-century Polish mathematicians
1881 births
1949 deaths
People from Ivano-Frankivsk